Sphaeropezia is a genus of fungi in the family Odontotremataceae. It has 22 species. Originally circumscribed by Pier Andrea Saccardo in 1884, the genus was resurrected and revised in 2013.

Species
Sphaeropezia arctoalpina 
Sphaeropezia bryoriae 
Sphaeropezia capreae 
Sphaeropezia cassiopes 
Sphaeropezia cucularis 
Sphaeropezia figulina 
Sphaeropezia grimmiae 
Sphaeropezia hepaticarum 
Sphaeropezia intermedia 
Sphaeropezia japewiae 
Sphaeropezia lecanorae 
Sphaeropezia leucocheila 
Sphaeropezia lyckselensis 
Sphaeropezia melaneliae 
Sphaeropezia mycoblasti 
Sphaeropezia navarinoi 
Sphaeropezia ochrolechiae 
Sphaeropezia pertusariae 
Sphaeropezia rhizocarpicola 
Sphaeropezia santessonii 
Sphaeropezia shangrilaensis 
Sphaeropezia sipei 
Sphaeropezia thamnoliae

References

Ostropales
Taxa described in 1884
Taxa named by Pier Andrea Saccardo